Ernest Still was a rugby union international who represented England from 1873 to 1873.

Early life
Ernest Still was born on 14 July 1852 in Epsom, the fifth son of Robert Still of Sutton in Surrey. He attended Rugby School and went on to study law at Brasenose College, Oxford from where he received his BA in 1874 and his MA in 1880.

Rugby union career
Still made his international debut on 3 March 1873 at Hamilton Crescent, Glasgow in the Scotland vs England match.

Career and later life
Ernest became a solicitor and later married Amy Gordon Churchill, the daughter of Charles Churchill. Their son, Francis Churchill Still, married Margaret Burdett Money-Coutts, daughter of Francis Burdett Thomas Coutts-Nevill, 5th Lord Latymer and Edith Ellen Churchill, on 8 June 1907. He died on 14 December 1937.

References

1852 births
1931 deaths
English rugby union players
England international rugby union players
Rugby union forwards
Rugby union players from Epsom